Caritas Việt Nam (Caritas Vietnam) is a Catholic charitable organization in Vietnam. This organization also called The Commission on Charity and Social Actions (Ủy ban Bác ái Xã hội), under the Catholic Bishops' Conference of Vietnam (CBCV) executive, and a member of Caritas International.

History
CBCV of South Vietnam established Caritas in 1965 at the Central level. During 1965–1976, Caritas Việt Nam has been active throughout the diocese in the south with Central Office located at #1 Tran Hoang Quan, District 5, Saigon (now #1 Nguyen Chi Thanh, District 5, Ho Chi Minh City). During Vietnam War, Caritas Vietnam has been actively helping the victims of poverty, the disabled, orphans, widows, many programs for medical help people leprosy, deaf and dumb; training career, providing scholarships to poor students and programs to help war victims return origin country.

Caritas Việt Nam's network continuous operation with the help of financial and personnel from the Holy See and countries like France, Germany, Belgium, United States ...

In 1966, this organization was founded the diocesan level, the name of each diocese is placed after the word "Caritas", for example, Caritas Sài Gòn, Caritas Xuân Lộc, Caritas Huế ... Each Caritas are operating under the joint program of Caritas Vietnam set.

By June 1976, Caritas Việt Nam was ordered to dissolve by the government of Vietnam. However, the CBCV keeps proposal enables Caritas State running back and reintegrate with Caritas International. This is expressed as early as 1999, when compiling the yearbook Vietnam Catholic Church have referred this organization as a Catholic Action Movement.

In 2001, Charitable and Social Commission under the CBCV was established, on this occasion the Council reiterated the offer on, and on March 5, 2008, Charitable and Social Committee has an official application to the Board of Religious Affairs to be established Caritas Việt Nam, with the organizational structure from the diocese to the parish to conform to social and charitable activities worldwide. July 2, 2008, Religious Affairs Committee sent a letter formally respond permission Caritas Việt Nam re-established. Caritas Việt Nam considers itself a member of Caritas International, however, the Government of Vietnam is not licensed to Caritas International to establish a branch in Vietnam.

Charities based in Vietnam
Caritas Internationalis